Pascal Praud (born 9 September 1964) is a French sports journalist, radio columnist, radio host, television presenter and producer. After 20 years with TF1, especially alongside Thierry Roland on Téléfoot, he became general manager in charge of communication and marketing of FC Nantes in 2008 for two years. On radio, since 2010, he has hosted several sports broadcasts on RTL, also writing a column for the station's morning show from 2014 to 2018. On television, since 2017, he has produced and hosted several shows on CNews dealing with football as well as current affairs and politics.

Filmography 
He played himself in a short appearance in the film Trois Zéros by Fabien Onteniente (2002).

Radio 
In 1988–2012 he commented on On refait le match, a broadcast by Eugène Saccomano on RTL. In 1988–2008 he hosted Tirs au but on RTL. In 2010–2018 he co-hosted Multiplex RTL-L'Équipe et du Grand match de Ligue 1 on RTL, alongside Christian Ollivier. In 2012–2018 he hosted On refait le match on RTL. In 2014–2018 he was an editorialist on Le Praud de l'Info in Yves Calvi's daily morning show, as well as L'Actualité de la semaine écoulée on Saturdays on RTL. Since 2018 he has hosted Auditeurs ont la parole on RTL.

References

External links 

 Official Twitter

French television presenters
French television producers
French radio presenters
French radio journalists
French sports journalists
French football chairmen and investors
Mass media people from Nantes
1964 births
Living people